John William Ramsay (1 June 1928 – 30 June 1988) was an Australian athlete who competed in the 1948 Summer Olympics in the 400m and 800m.

References

1928 births
1988 deaths
Australian male sprinters
Australian male middle-distance runners
Olympic athletes of Australia
Athletes (track and field) at the 1948 Summer Olympics